Paul Read may refer to:

Paul Read (footballer) (born 1973), retired English footballer
Paul Read (music producer), British recording engineer and music producer

See also
Paul Reid (disambiguation)
Paul Reed (disambiguation)
Paul Reade (1943–1997), English composer